Library science education in India has existed since the late 19th century. During the post-independence period, library-science education gained momentum with the assistance of the International Federation of Library Associations and Institutions and UNESCO, and is centered at the university level. Library and information science (LIS) increased in popularity during the early 1990s with the establishment of the Indira Gandhi National Open University (IGNOU). In addition to the IGNOU, several of the 13 state open universities provide LIS programmes. U.P Rajarshi Tandon Open University (UPRTOU) in Allahabad offers LIS degree programs through distance learning at the bachelor's, master's and doctoral level. Dr.B.R.Ambedkar Open University established in 1982 is offering BLISc, MLIS, M.Phil. & Ph.D. Programmes in Library Sciences.

References

External links
IGNOU website

Library science education
Science education in India
Libraries in India